Papilio homothoas, the false giant swallowtail, is a species of swallowtail butterfly from the genus Papilio that is found in Colombia, Venezuela, Trinidad, Panama, and Costa Rica.

References

homothoas
Butterflies described in 1906
Papilionidae of South America